Sequim Valley Airport  is a privately owned, public use airport located four nautical miles (5 mi, 7 km) northwest of the central business district of Sequim, a city in Clallam County, Washington, United States.

History
During 2022, a website named Barnstormers.com listed the airport as "being for sale" with an asking price of $4,750,000 US dollars.

Facilities and aircraft 
Sequim Valley Airport covers an area of 190 acres (77 ha) at an elevation of 144 feet (44 m) above mean sea level. It has two runways: 9R/27L is 3,510 by 40 feet (1,070 x 12 m) with an asphalt surface and 9L/27R is 3,500 by 100 feet (1,067 x 30 m) with a turf surface.

For the 12-month period ending April 30, 2009, the airport had 8,000 general aviation aircraft operations, an average of 21 per day. At that time there were 30 aircraft based at this airport: 93% single-engine and 7% multi-engine.

References

External links 
 Sequim Valley Airport (W28) at WSDOT Airport Directory
 Aerial image as of June 1994 from USGS The National Map

Airports in Washington (state)
Transportation buildings and structures in Clallam County, Washington